Major-General Thomas Charles Pleydell Calley  (28 January 1856 – 14 February 1932) was a British military officer and Liberal Unionist politician.

Military career
Calley was the son of Henry Calley, JP, DL, of Burderop Park, Wiltshire, and was educated at Harrow School and at Christ Church, Oxford.

He joined the 1st Life Guards in 1876 and served in Egypt in 1882, where he took part in the Battle of Tel el-Kebir. In 1886 he was appointed captain, promoted to major in 1894, lieutenant-colonel in 1898, and a brevet colonel in November 1900 for service in the Second Boer War in South Africa 1899–1900. He was appointed a Member of the Royal Victorian Order (MVO) in July 1901, and served as Silver Stick in Waiting to King Edward VII during his coronation in August 1902. Four months later, he was appointed in command of the 1st Life Guards, serving asu such until 1906, during which he was appointed a Companion of the Order of the Bath (CB) in 1905. He went on to become a brigade commander of the London Mounted Brigade (1908–12).

He was elected at the January 1910 general election as Member of Parliament (MP) for Cricklade, winning the seat from the sitting Liberal MP John Massie.  However, at the general election in December 1910, he narrowly lost the seat to another Liberal candidate and did not stand for Parliament again. He was General Officer Commanding 60th (2/2nd London) Division from October 1914 to December 1915 during the First World War.

Family
Calley married, in 1883, Emily Chappell, daughter of T. D. Chappell, of Teddington. They had one daughter.

References

External links 
 
 Portraits of Major-General Thomas Charles Pleydell Calley in the National Portrait Gallery, London

|-

1856 births
1932 deaths
People educated at Harrow School
Alumni of Christ Church, Oxford
UK MPs 1910
Liberal Unionist Party MPs for English constituencies
British Army major generals
Commanders of the Order of the British Empire
Companions of the Order of the Bath
Members of the Royal Victorian Order
British Life Guards officers
British Army cavalry generals of World War I
Members of the Parliament of the United Kingdom for Cricklade